Jerome Feldman is professor of the history of art at Hawaii Pacific University where he specializes in the art of tribal Southeast Asia and the Pacific Islands. He was Slade Professor of Fine Art at the University of Cambridge for 2004–05.

Selected publications
 The Eloquent Dead: Ancestral Sculpture of Indonesia and Southeast Asia. 1985. (Edited)
 The Art of Micronesia: The University of Hawaii Art Gallery. University of Hawaii, 1986.
 Nias Tribal Treasures: Cosmic Reflections in Stone, Wood, and Gold. Delf, 1990. 
 Arc of the Ancestors: Indonesian Art from the Jerome L. Joss Collection at UCLA. Fowler Museum of Cultural History, University of California, Los Angeles, 1994. 
 Mentawai Art. Archipelago Press, 1999. (joint)

References

External links 
Jerome Feldman

Slade Professors of Fine Art (University of Cambridge)
Hawaii Pacific University people
Living people
Year of birth missing (living people)
American art historians